Kanmanikkorumma (Ushnabhoomi) is a 1982 Indian Malayalam film, produced and directed by P.K. Krishnan. The film stars Venu Nagavally, Nedumudi Venu, Ravi Menon, Jalaja and Menaka in lead roles. The film had musical score by Shyam.

Crew 
Story-Production-Direction:  P.K. Krishnan
Screenplay-Dialogues:  Sarath Baby
Cinematography:  S. Ayyappan
Editing:  P. Lakshmanan
Music:  Shyam
Lyrics:  Poovachal Khader
Singing:  K.J. Yesudas, Ambili, Zero Babu, Kousalya
Art:  Surya Sreeni

Cast
Venu Nagavally
Nedumudi Venu
Ravi Menon
Nellikode Bhaskaran
Kuthiravattam Pappu
Balan K Nair
Sreenivasan
Jalaja
Menaka
Santha Kumari

References

External links
 Song Collections

1982 films
1980s Malayalam-language films